The International Coral Reef Initiative (ICRI) is an informal partnership among nations, international organisations and non-government organisations to help protect coral reefs globally. It aims to implement Chapter 17 of Agenda 21, Aichi Target 10 of the Convention on Biological Diversity's 10-year Strategic Plan, and other relevant internationally agreed objectives and targets. It does so by:
 raising global awareness on the plight of coral reefs around the world
 promoting the sharing of best practices in coral reef management and building capacity of coral reef managers around the world
 ensuring that coral reefs are included in relevant international deliberations.
It is the "only global entity solely devoted to coral reefs".

History
ICRI was established in 1994 at the initiative of eight founding nations: Australia, France, Japan, Jamaica, the Philippines, Sweden, the United Kingdom, and the United States. It was launched at the First Conference of the Parties of the Convention on Biological Diversity, held in the Bahamas in December 1994, and subsequently announced at the high level segment of the Intersessional Meeting of the United Nations Commission on Sustainable Development in April 1995. The first General Meeting of members was held in Dumaguete, Philippines, in June 1995 where ICRI's foundational documents were adopted: its "Call to Action" and "Framework for Action" for achieving sustainable management of coral reefs and related ecosystems. The "Call to Action" was renewed in 1998 at the first International Tropical Marine Ecosystems Management Symposium held in Townsville, Australia and endorsed by over 300 delegates from 49 nations.

A Continuing Call to Action (and associated Framework for Action) was further adopted at ICRI's 28th General Meeting in October 2013 in Belize.

Governance
The Initiative functions through a rotating Secretariat hosted by member nations; since 2001 the Secretariat has been hosted in partnership by a 'developed' nation and a 'developing' nation. The Secretariat is responsible for organising General Meetings of members, drafting documents, coordinating membership, and liaising with relevant international organisations. It presents of Plan of Action (or hosting objectives) for its hosting period at the inception of its hosting period.
The Secretariat has been hosted by the following Nations:
 the United States of America (1995–96)
 Australia (1997–98)
 France (1999-2000)
 Sweden and the Philippines (2001–03)
 The United Kingdom and the Seychelles (2003–05)
 Japan and Palau (2005–07)
 The United States of America and Mexico (2007–09)
 France and Samoa (2009-2011)
 Australia and Belize (2012–14)
 Japan and Thailand (2014–16).

The governing body of ICRI is its General Meetings, held at least annually and where members can adopt decision, resolutions and recommendations on specific topics. ICRI has also encouraged since its inception the holding of regional meetings and workshops to develop coordinated regional responses to coral reef threats. The most active region in this regard has been East Asia which holds annual regional ICRI workshops.

Networks and committees
ICRI has established Operational Networks and temporary Ad Hoc Committees, which are working groups set-up on a temporary basis to progress specific issues or tackle specialized topics related to coral reef management. The most well-known Operational Network is the Global Coral Reef Monitoring Network which produces global and regional reports on the status of coral reefs on a regular basis. Information provide bolo Tara Tara bolo Tara Tara management and conservation decisions.

ICRI and the United Nations
Although ICRI is not a United Nations body, it is regularly cited in UN documents such as Secretary General Reports. Most recently, it was cited in resolution adopted by the United Nations General Assembly at its 67th session in November 2012.

Reference's

External links
Home page

International environmental organizations
Coral reefs
Conservation projects
1994 establishments in North America